Torup is a locality situated in Hylte Municipality, Halland County, Sweden with 1,183 inhabitants in 2010.

Climate
Torup has a transitional oceanic climate with considerable moderate continental attributes. It is consistently the rainiest location in the country of the official 100 reference weather stations used by SMHI for its monthly reports. Considering its southerly latitude in the country, cold extremes are unusually common. Frost has been recorded even in the midst of summer. Temperature normals however do not differ much from other southern Sweden localities, with winter highs most often staying above freezing and summers being warm.

References 

Populated places in Hylte Municipality